The Gymnázium Jana Keplera (English: Johannes Kepler Grammar School or Johannes Kepler Gymnasium) is a public gymnasium located in Prague 6 district in Prague, Czech Republic. It offers eight-year and four-year programmes covering both sciences and humanities and including the study of foreign languages (English language is compulsory, for the last four years students choose French language or German language in addition). The school has approximately 75 teachers and 600 students and is housed within a single building comprising three parts. The oldest part was built in 1932 in the functionalist style. On 6 June 1971 the school, which changed names several times during its existence, was named in honor of Johannes Kepler.

Each year the school opens one class on the eight-year programme (where pupils begin at the age of eleven, having transferred to gymnasium after just five years of attendance at primary school) and three classes on the four-year programme (for fifteen-year-old entrants who have completed a full nine years at primary school), so there are a total of twenty classes at the school. The final-year students take the maturita, the Czech school-leaving exam. Gymnázium Jana Keplera offers numerous extracurricular activities, for example being part of a musical ensemble or a drama club. The school has a sports ground and three indoor gyms. The library comprises almost 17,000 volumes of classical literature and textbooks as well as recent scholarly writings.

Gymnázium Jana Keplera is considered one of the most prestigious schools in Czech Republic. Their students continuously achieve one of the best results in the final exam "Maturita" as well as in many different high school mathematics, physics and language competitions.

References

External links
 Official website

Educational institutions established in 1932
1932 establishments in Czechoslovakia
Gymnasiums in the Czech Republic
Schools in Prague